Yasuj Chain Dam is a collection of small hydroelectric dams in Iran with a current installed electricity generating capability of 16.8 MW. The complementing system of 9 run-of-the-river hydroelectricity plants is situated near the town of Sisakht in Kohgiluyeh and Boyer-Ahmad Province. The system which first came online in 2005, is currently being upgraded to 25 MW capacity.

See also

List of power stations in Iran

References

Hydroelectric power stations in Iran